The Tenth Mother of all Battles Championship, commonly referred to as the 2000 Iraqi Elite Cup, was the tenth occurrence of the Iraqi Elite Cup. The competition was organised by the Iraq Football Association and the top eight teams of the 1999–2000 Iraqi First Division competed in the tournament. The competition started on 3 December 2000 and ended on 15 December 2000 where, in the final, held at Al-Shaab Stadium, Al-Shorta defeated Al-Zawraa 1–0. Al-Karkh midfielder Ammar Abdul-Hussein was the player of the tournament.

Group stage

Group 1

Group 2

Semifinals

Third place match

Final

References

External links
 Iraqi Football Website

2000–01 in Iraqi football
Football competitions in Iraq